Sven Olof Krokström (2 May 1895 – 31 August 1971) was a Swedish sprinter who competed at the 1920 Summer Olympics. He finished fifth with the Swedish 4 × 400 m relay team and failed to reach the finals of the 200 m event and 400 m events.

References

1895 births
1971 deaths
Swedish male sprinters
Athletes (track and field) at the 1920 Summer Olympics
Olympic athletes of Sweden
People from Gävle
Sportspeople from Gävleborg County
20th-century Swedish people